Fenson is a surname. Notable people with the surname include:

Eric Fenson (born 1971), American curler
Pete Fenson (born 1968), American curler, brother of Eric
Ricky Fenson (born 1945), British rock bass guitarist

See also
FenCon
Fenton (name)